Ussishkin  may refer to:

Menachem Ussishkin
David Ussishkin
Ussishkin, a character in the 1972 Soviet comedy film As Ilf and Petrov rode a tram
Ussishkin Street, Tel-Aviv
Ussishkin Arena, Tel-Aviv
Hapoel Ussishkin, a former Israeli basketball club